John William Fenton (12 March 1828 – 28 April 1890) was an Irish musician of Scottish descent and the leader of a military band in Japan at the start of the Meiji period. He is considered "the first bandmaster in Japan" and "the father of band music in Japan." Fenton is best known for having initiated the process through which Kimi ga yo came to be accepted as the national anthem of Japan.

Fenton is considered Irish because he was born in Kinsale, County Cork, in Ireland in 1828. He may also be considered Scottish because his father John Fenton (1790–1833) was born in Brechin, and because he lived in Montrose around 1881. His mother, Judith Towers, was probably English. Journalistic writing on Fenton typically considers him a Briton.

Bandmaster in Japan
Fenton, bandmaster of Britain's 10th Regiment of Foot, 1st Battalion, arrived in Japan in 1868. The regiment had been sent to protect the small foreign community in Yokohama during the transitional period at the end of the Tokugawa shogunate and the early years of the Meiji restoration.

Japanese naval cadets overheard the brass band rehearsing; and they persuaded Fenton to become their instructor. The central band of the Japanese Maritime Self-Defense Force traditionally considers this first group of cadet musicians as the earliest of Japan's naval bands. In due course, Fenton ordered instruments from London for his Japanese students.

When Fenton's battalion left Japan in 1871, he remained for an additional six years as a bandmaster with the newly formed Japanese navy and then the band of the imperial court.

Japan's national anthem

In 1869, Fenton realised that there was no national anthem; and Japan's leaders were convinced that a modern nation state needed a national anthem. Initially, Fenton collaborated with Artillery Captain Ōyama Iwao, who was the son of a samurai family of the Satsuma han domain and an officer of the Satsuma military forces. Ōyama was well versed in Japanese and Chinese literature, and agreed to find a suitable Japanese poem that could be set to music. Ōyama chose a 10th-century poem that prayed for the longevity of the Lord, usually assumed to be the Emperor. These words became the anthem's lyrics.

The lyrics are said to have been chosen for their similarity to the British national anthem. Fenton had stressed the words and music of this specific anthem as illustrating what a Japanese anthem would also need.

Ōyama is said to have asked Fenton to make the melody for it, but some later complained that there was too much similarity with a Satsuma lute tune. The melody was composed and was performed before the Emperor in 1870. As it happened, Fenton had only three weeks to compose the music and a few days to rehearse before performing the anthem to the Emperor.

Fenton's music was only the first version of Kimi ga Yo. Fenton's version is performed annually at the Myōkōji Shrine in Yokohama. This shrine is near where Fenton was based as a military band leader.

In 1880, the Imperial Household Agency adopted a modified melody attributed to Hiromori Hayashi. Although the melody is based on a traditional mode of Japanese court music, it is composed in a mixed style derived from Western hymns. Some elements of the Fenton arrangement are retained; In 1879–1880, a German musician and foreign advisor (Oyatoi gaikokujin) adapted the melody using Western style harmonies. The version developed by Franz Eckert using Fenton's and Hayashi's themes became the second and current version of Kimi ga Yo. The harmonisation and orchestration of Kimi ga Yo is the combined work of these influential bandmasters.

Later years
Fenton's regiment left Japan in 1871, but he stayed for a further six years as a bandmaster with the newly formed Japanese navy and then the band of the imperial court. The cost of his salary during this period was shared by the navy and by the Imperial Palace Music Department (Gagaku bureau).

Fenton's first wife, Annie Maria, died in 1871 aged 40. Her grave is in Yokohama Foreigners' Cemetery. He remarried Jane Pilkington and left Japan in April 1877, sailing to San Francisco.

In 1881, census records locate Fenton, with his American-born wife Jessie P. Fenton and daughters Jessie and Maria, living in Montrose, Angus, Scotland; but at some point, he returned to California where he died on 28 April 1890. He is buried in Santa Cruz, California.

References

Bibliography
 Boyd, Richard and Tak-Wing Ngo, State making in Asia. (London: Routledge, 2006), .
 Conant, Ellen P., Challenging Past and Present: The Metamorphosis of Nineteenth-century Japanese Art. (Honolulu: University of Hawaii Press, 2006), .
 Huffman, James, Modern Japan: An Encyclopedia of History, Culture, and Nationalism (London: Taylor & Francis, 1997), .

1828 births
1890 deaths
19th-century classical composers
British military musicians
Foreign advisors to the government in Meiji-period Japan
Irish classical composers
Irish expatriates in Japan
Musicians from County Cork
People from Kinsale